Delfshaven is an underground subway station in the Dutch city of Rotterdam. It is served by lines A, B, and C of the Rotterdam Metro. The station is part of the two station long extension of the East-West Line (or Caland line) and opened on 25 April 1986. This extension connected the line's former terminus Coolhaven with the new Marconiplein station.

In 2001, Delfshaven station was renovated. Since then, the walls of the station show traditional Delft blue motives.

External links

Rotterdam Metro stations
Railway stations opened in 1986
1986 establishments in the Netherlands
Railway stations in the Netherlands opened in the 20th century